Charles Page (born 1 September 1946 in Melbourne) is a Brisbane-based documentary photographer, and lecturer at the Queensland College of Art. He studied at Griffith University where he got a PhD.

Biography 
Page, described by Merle Hathaway, Director of the Horsham Regional Art Gallery, as "one of Australia's best itinerant documentary photographers", began photographing in his early teens. He obtained a Bachelor of Arts (Photography) in 1981 from the Royal Melbourne Institute of Technology. After working as a photographer in Melbourne for several years, he moved to Queensland to take up a lecturing position with the Queensland College of Art.  In 2003 he was awarded a PhD (By Publication) by Griffith University for his photographic achievements.

Page's photography extends from documenting the mundane to the extremes of human life. Over an extensive career, Page has photographed in more than 70 countries, notably Chechnya, Somalia and Antarctica, covering themes as varied as War Photography, Nature photography, Portrait Photography, and the nude.   
 
Page's work has been exhibited in a number solo and group exhibitions, both in Australia and overseas.  His work is in numerous public and private collections, including Australian Antarctic Division, Australian Parliament House, Australian War Memorial (Canberra), International Committee of the Red Cross (Geneva), the Queensland Art Gallery (QAG List of Artists), and the National Library of Australia.

Commissions 
From 1984 to 1986 Page was one of 22 Australian photographers commissioned by the New Parliament House Construction Authority Art Acquisitions Committee to produce a folio of photographs based on the construction of the new Australian Parliament House, Canberra. Images from this commission can be found in Picture Australia and the National Library of Australia, as well as images from Australian Antarctic Territory, Boggo Road Goal, construction of the Alice Springs to Darwin Railway, 2003, and 1st Battalion, Royal Australian Regiment in Somalia  .

In 1988, he was one of six photographers commissioned by the Queensland Art Gallery and the Australian Bicentennial Authority to document Queensland community life. The project, which culminated in the exhibition Journey's North at the Queensland Art Gallery, aimed to encourage achievement and appreciation of contemporary art photography, as much as to celebrate and record the richness and diversity of community life in the late 1980s.

Projects 
Page's national and international projects include:  
1967–99 An extensive project to document the decline of steam locomotion in rail transportation. The project involved all Australian states;
1993 Photographed in the Antarctic under the auspices of ANARE (Australian National Antarctic Research Expeditions) (Australian Arctic Arts Fellowship).  The project addressed environmental issues, the removal of the last Australian Huskies and the Antarctic Landscape.  Images from this project are displayed at Mawson Base, Antarctica.;
1972–2002 An extensive project to document photographically the decline of steam locomotion. The project also addressed the sociological implications brought about by this evolution in technology. The project concentrated on the following countries: 
1972 South Africa, Rhodesia, Swaziland, Europe; 
1978 China, India, Malaysia; 
1980 India, Pakistan; 
1999 Western China, Inner Mongolia; 
2001 the Forest railways of Manchuria, Northern China; 
2002 Western China, Heavy Industrial sites and operational Steam Trains; 
1992 Photographed in Pakistan and Afghanistan the operations of the International Committee of Red Cross. This project concentrated on I.C.R.C. activities concerned with the Afghanistan War;
1993 Photographed in Malawi, Mozambique and Somalia.  A number of images from Somalia are included in the collection of the Australian War Memorial.  Page was one of only two photographers to record the convoy from the port of Mogadishu to Baidoa by members of the 1st Battalion, The Royal Australian Regiment (1RAR) and a United States convoy of troops.  ( Australian War Memorial Collection)  ;
1995 & 1996 Photographed in Chechnya (Russian Federation) under the auspices of the International Committee of Red Cross. This project concentrated on ICRC activities concerned with the Chechnyan conflict;
2000 & 2003 documented five Ipswich communities in the following geographical locations, Australia, U.S.A.[2], the U.K. and Jamaica;
2005 Documented the environmentally disastrous Saemangeum reclamation project in South Korea.  For more information see Saemangeum reference page from Birds Korea

Publications 
Charles J. Page (2007). The Crystal Desert.  Antarctic Photographs.   [hbk]. 
Charles J. Page (2007). Cross Section.  The documentary photography of Charles Page. Horsham Regional Art Gallery.  [pbk].   
Charles J. Page (2003).Visible traces of another life : the photography of Charles John Page 1966-2003: exhibition catalogue. Rockhampton, Qld: Rockhampton Art Gallery.

References 

 Ahrens, Prue. (2004). "Ipswich x 5.  A tour of parallel places".  Media Review.
 Anderson, David (2003).   ABC Central Queensland radio interview. 
 Benalla Art Gallery. (2005). "Charles Page: A Matter of Conscience". Media Release.
 Catanzaro, Joseph.  (2007).  "Flight to the Death", article on Saemangeum Wetlands in The Bulletin  including image gallery 
 Douglas, Craig. (2005). "Cultivating the [new] country:  disclosing through curatorship the cultural and economic development potential of the Australian regional art museum." p. 165.
 PhD Thesis 
 Flynn, Chloe.  (2003).  "Out of the War Zone" "State of the Arts" Article.
 Smith, Sue. (2003).  Visible Traces of Another Life.  The photography of Charles John Page 1966 – 2003.  Rockhampton:  Rockhampton Art Gallery.
 Queensland College of Art (2004). "Pictures that Paint a Thousand Words"  Media Release.
 Rockhampton Art Gallery (2003).  "War Zone Photography" Media Release.
 Seear, Lynne & Ewington, Julie (Eds). (2007). Documentary Photography in Queensland in the 1980s. in "Brought to Light II.  Contemporary Australian Art 1966–2006 from the Queensland Art Gallery Collection", Brisbane:  Queensland Art Gallery Publishing, pp. 119–123. Image p. 122. 
 Williamson, Claire. (1988). "Journeys North" Brisbane:  Queensland Art Gallery.

External links 
Charles Page's Website
Charles Page's Steamtrain Website
Charles Page – Saemangeum Project, Korea
Australian Antarctic Division
Josef Lebovic Gallery
 Queensland Art Gallery exhibition "How We Live"
 Journey's North publication

Australian photographers
People from Brisbane
RMIT University alumni
1946 births
Living people
Documentary photographers
Griffith University alumni
Academic staff of Griffith University